Alwyn Lindsay (4 June 1923 – 24 August 2001) was an Australian rules footballer who played with Geelong in the Victorian Football League (VFL).

Lindsay, a utility, played 31 league games for Geelong, from 1945 to 1947.

He captain-coached Geelong West in the 1950 Ballarat Football League season.

References

External links

1923 births
Australian rules footballers from Victoria (Australia)
Geelong Football Club players
Geelong West Football Club players
Geelong West Football Club coaches
2001 deaths